The 1916 Mississippi College Collegians football team was an American football team that represented Mississippi College as a member of the Southern Intercollegiate Athletic Association (SIAA) during the 1916 college football season. In their first year under head coach Dudy Noble, the team compiled a 6–3 record.

Schedule

References

Mississippi College
Mississippi College Choctaws football seasons
Mississippi College Collegians football